The Mont-Saint-Michel Bay is located between Brittany (to the south west) and the Normandy peninsula of Cotentin (to the south and east). The bay was listed as a UNESCO world heritage site in 1979 for its aesthetic quality and its importance to the Christian tradition. Due to the significant tidal movements in this region (over 10 meters) a large part of the bay is uncovered at low tide. There are two granitic islands in the bay: Tombelaine and the Mont-Saint-Michel. Many birds and harbor seals live in this area.

General considerations 

Adjacent towns and villages 
The following towns and villages surround the bay, from north to south:
 In Normandy : Carolles, Champeaux, Saint-Jean-le-Thomas, Dragey-Ronthon, Genêts, Vains, Marcey-les-Grèves, Avranches, Le Val-Saint-Père, Céaux, Courtils, Huisnes-sur-Mer, Pontorson, Le Mont-Saint-Michel, Beauvoir.
 In Brittany : Saint-Georges-de-Gréhaigne, Roz-sur-Couesnon, Saint-Broladre, Cherrueix, Mont-Dol, Le Vivier-sur-Mer, Hirel, Saint-Benoît-des-Ondes, Saint-Méloir-des-Ondes and Cancale.

Geography

Rivers 
Three small rivers end in the bay (and cross it at low tide): the Couesnon, now blocked to the west of Mont Saint-Michel by a causeway, the Sée and the Sélune. The very low slope of the bay and the very large tides formed a mascaret in those rivers that can travel upstream for many kilometers.

Three larger rivers end in the bay: the Sélune, the Sée and mainly the Couesnon that, accordingly to some local folk stories, was originally the boundary between Normandy and Brittany but then moved to the West of the Mont placing it in Normandy. In reality the boundary is not at the river location but  further to the west, at the foot of Mont Saint-Broladre.

Biggest tides in Europe 
Some of the biggest tides in Europe occur in Mont-Saint-Michel Bay: with an average  amplitude, they reach  in average and up to  during the highest tides. This is due in part to the low depth of the bay and the barrier effect from the Cotentin Peninsula.

The tides have been described by Victor Hugo as "à la vitesse d'un cheval au galop (as swiftly as a galloping horse)". In reality the full extent of the tides is only visible at the entry of the bay (the sea level around the mont Saint-Michel is above the low tide level) and its actual speed is closer to a walking human, the fastest observed being around 6.1 km/h.

The tides mix the water, creating a rich local ecosystem. The intertidal zone, the coastal area affected by the tides is about 200 km2 wide.

During the highest tide, a tidal bore can be observedless so since the bay has been under restoration work.

Levee and polders

The levee 
Polders have been developed in Mont-Saint-Michel Bay from the 8th century or earlier than that. Between "Pointe de Château-Richeux" and Mont Saint-Broladre seashell deposits have been used to create levees around Dol marsh. To the East of Sainte-Anne chapel is the "Duchesse-Anne" levee. It was built during the 11th century using granite rocks. It marks the southern border of the polders.

In 1856, M. Mosselman, founder of the "Cie des Polders de l'Ouest", was given a concession to cultivate 3,800 hectares of shoreline between Sainte-Anne chapel, Moidrey bay, Roche-Torin and the Mont Saint Michel.

References

Mont St Michel
Landforms of Brittany
Landforms of Normandy
Ramsar sites in Metropolitan France